Essence (subtitled John Lewis Plays the Compositions & Arrangements of Gary McFarland) is an album by pianist and conductor John Lewis recorded for the Atlantic label in 1960 and 1962.

Reception

Allmusic awarded the album 3 stars.

Track listing
All compositions by Gary McFarland
 "Hopeful Encounter" - 4:47
 "Tillamook Two" - 7:11
 "Night Float" - 4:14
 "Notions" - 3:57
 "Another Encounter" = 5:09
 "Wish Me Well" - 7:45
Recorded in New York City on September 9, 1960 (track 3), May 25, 1962 (tracks 1, 4 & 6) and October 5, 1962 (2 & 5)

Personnel 
John Lewis - piano
Freddie Hubbard (tracks 1, 4 & 6), Louis Mucci (tracks 1, 4 & 6), Herb Pomeroy (track 3), Nick Travis (tracks 1, 4 & 6) - trumpet 
Mike Zwerin - trombone (tracks 1, 4 & 6)
Bob Northern (tracks 1, 4 & 6), Gunther Schuller (track 3), Robert Swisshelm (tracks 1, 4 & 6) - French horn 
Don Butterfield - tuba (tracks 1, 4 & 6)
Harold Jones - flute (tracks 2 & 5)
William Arrowsmith - oboe (tracks 2 & 5) 
Loren Glickman - bassoon (tracks 2 & 5) 
Phil Woods - clarinet (tracks 2 & 5) 
Don Stewart - basset horn (tracks 2 & 5) 
Eric Dolphy (track 2, 3 & 5) - alto saxophone, flute
Benny Golson (track 3) - tenor saxophone
Gene Allen (tracks 2 & 5), Jimmy Giuffre (track 3) - baritone saxophone 
Billy Bean (tracks 1, 4 & 6), Jim Hall (tracks 2, 3 & 5) - guitar
Richard Davis (tracks 1, 2 & 4-6), George Duvivier (track 3) - bass 
Connie Kay - drums
Gary McFarland - arranger

References 

1962 albums
John Lewis (pianist) albums
Albums arranged by Gary McFarland
Albums produced by Nesuhi Ertegun
Albums produced by Tom Dowd
Atlantic Records albums